Eponymous is the first greatest hits album by the American alternative rock band R.E.M., released in 1988. It was their last authorized  release on I.R.S. Records, to whom they had been contracted since 1982, having just signed with Warner Bros. Records.

Eponymous includes several alternative versions of songs, including the soundtrack contribution "Romance", which had not previously appeared on an R.E.M. record. Spanning from the initial single release of "Radio Free Europe" to the previous year's breakthrough hit album Document, Eponymous provides a fair overview of R.E.M.'s early work.

The album features the alternate title "File Under Grain", a reference to the cover photograph. A previous album, Document, had "File Under Fire" inscribed on it, and Reckoning featured the words "File Under Water". On the reverse of the LP cover is a photograph of singer Michael Stipe with the words "They Airbrushed My Face" above his head. The photo is the senior portrait taken of Stipe while at Collinsville High School in Collinsville, Illinois. It appears in the Class of 1978 high school year book.

Released in October 1988, just a month before R.E.M.'s Warner Bros. debut Green appeared, Eponymous reached #44 in the US and #69 in the UK.

Track listing
All songs written by Bill Berry, Peter Buck, Mike Mills and Michael Stipe:

Side one – "Early"
"Radio Free Europe" (original Hib-Tone single) (1981) – 3:47
"Gardening at Night" (different vocal mix)1 – 3:30
"Talk About the Passion" (from Murmur, 1983) – 3:20
"So. Central Rain" (from Reckoning, 1984) – 3:15
"(Don't Go Back To) Rockville" (from Reckoning, 1984) – 4:32
"Cant Get There from Here" (from Fables of the Reconstruction, 1985) – 3:39

Side two – "Late"
 "Driver 8" (from Fables of the Reconstruction, 1985) – 3:23 
"Romance" (from soundtrack album to the 1987 film Made in Heaven) – 3:25
"Fall on Me" (from Lifes Rich Pageant, 1986) – 2:50
"The One I Love" (from Document, 1987) – 3:16
"Finest Worksong" (mutual drum horn mix) (from "Finest Worksong" single) – 3:50
"It's the End of the World as We Know It (And I Feel Fine)" (from Document, 1987) – 4:05

Notes
1 Different mix from version on Chronic Town.

Charts

References

External links

Albums produced by Don Dixon (musician)
Albums produced by Don Gehman
Albums produced by Joe Boyd
Albums produced by Mitch Easter
Albums produced by Scott Litt
R.E.M. compilation albums
1988 greatest hits albums
French-language compilation albums
I.R.S. Records compilation albums